South Park: Chef's Luv Shack is a 2D game show-style party video game and is a sequel to the 1998 video game South Park, itself based on the American animated sitcom of the same name. Developed by Acclaim Studios Austin and published by Acclaim Entertainment, it was released in 1999 for the Dreamcast, Microsoft Windows, PlayStation and Nintendo 64. Its gameplay involves playing minigames and the ability to play against other players in a challenge for the most points. It also involves trivia questions about South Park and other topics.

Chef's Luv Shack was met with mixed reviews. It was followed by Acclaim's South Park Rally in 2000.

Characters 
In the game, the player gets to choose to be one of four characters: Eric Cartman, Kenny McCormick, Kyle Broflovski, or Stan Marsh.

Gameplay 
The game intermittently switches between questions and mini-games, with a mini-game preceding every three questions. Players score points by correctly answering questions and mini-game ranking. Players lose points for questions answered incorrectly. The game is exclusively multiplayer; when played by one player, there is no AI, so that player always wins, even with a negative score. Players have the option to "shaft" (pass on) a question to another player after opting to answer the question. The "shafted" player can then pass the question on again or choose to answer the question. When "shafting", a question will always be answered by the last player to be "shafted". Despite Chef's Luv Shack appearing on all the major home gaming consoles at the time, the only instance of the game taking advantage of the then-modern hardware is the up-to-four player multiplayer game featured in the Nintendo 64 and Sega Dreamcast versions. The PlayStation version supports four players with an adapter, and the PC version allows 2 players to play with a keyboard and 2 more players to play with Joysticks.

Reception 

South Park: Chef's Luv Shack was met with mixed to negative reviews. Aggregating review website GameRankings gave the Nintendo 64 version 50.88%, the Dreamcast version 50.21%, the PC version 47.50%, and the PlayStation version 41.95%.

Blake Fischer reviewed the Dreamcast version of the game for Next Generation, rating it two stars out of five, and stated that, "If you've already burned out on YDKJ, and you need some game-show luvin', this is your only option, so you're stuck."

The Sydney Morning Herald gave the game three stars of five stating, "Not for the solo player but a great party game. Unfortunately, it is short on questions."

References

External links 
 

1999 video games
Acclaim Entertainment games
Dreamcast games
Multiplayer video games
Nintendo 64 games
Party video games
PlayStation (console) games
Video games based on South Park
Video games set in Colorado
Windows games
Video games developed in the United States